The 2015–16 season is Krka's 5th season in the Slovenian PrvaLiga, Slovenian top division, since the league was created.

Players
As of 1 March 2016

Source:NK Krka

Competitions

Overall

Overview

PrvaLiga

League table

Results summary

Results by round

Matches

Cup

First round

Round of 16

Statistics

Goalscorers

See also
2015–16 Slovenian PrvaLiga
2015–16 Slovenian Football Cup

References

External links
Official website 
PrvaLiga profile 
Twitter profile
Facebook profile
Soccerway profile

Slovenian football clubs 2015–16 season